Lucien Brouillard is a 1983 French Canadian political drama film directed by Bruno Carrière. It stars Pierre Curzi, Roger Blay and Marie Tifo.

Plot

Lucien Brouillard is a radical political activist whose aggressive efforts to combat injustice often lands him in trouble and leads him to neglect his wife Alice and their baby. The situation deteriorates when he unexpectedly encounters his childhood friend Martineau, a rich lawyer who has a close relationship with the provincial government.

Cast

 Pierre Curzi as Lucien Brouillard
 Roger Blay as Jacques Martineau
 Marie Tifo as Alice Tanguay
 Paul Savoie as André Morin
 Jean Duceppe as Prime Minister Provencher
 Germain Houde as Detective

Accolades
The film received six Genie Award nominations in 1984, for Best Motion Picture, Best Actor, Best Actress, Best Director, Best Art Director and Best Costume Design.

References

External links

1983 films
1980s French-language films
Canadian drama films
Films shot in Montreal
French-language Canadian films
1980s Canadian films